Ballyharney is a townland in County Westmeath, Ireland.

Ballyharney is one of 10 townlands of the civil parish of Lackan in the barony of Corkaree in the Province of Leinster.

The neighbouring townlands are: Hospitalbank and Monagead (barony of Moygoish) to the north, Lackanwood to the north–east, Lackan to the east and south, Grange to the south, Cappagh (Moygoish) to the west and Garriskil (Moygoish) to the north–west.

In the 1911 census of Ireland there were 8 houses and 36 inhabitants in the townland.

References

External links
Map of Ballyharney at openstreetmap.org
Ballyharney at the IreAtlas Townland Data Base
Ballyharney at Townlands.ie
Ballyharney at Logainm.ie

Townlands of County Westmeath